André Brochu (born 3 March 1942 in Saint-Eustache, Quebec) is a poet, essayist and professor of Quebecois literature.

Life 
He graduated from the Université de Montréal in 1961, and from Université Paris VIII.

He has been a member of the Académie des Lettres du Québec since September 1996.

Works

Poetry 
 Privilèges de l'ombre, L'Hexagone, 1961
 Les Matins nus, le vent, Éditions Trois, 1989
 Particulièrement la vie change, L'Hexagone, 1990
 
 
 
 L'Inconcevable, Éditions Trois, 1998
 Je t'aime, je t'écris, Québec-Amérique, 2001
 
 Élégies de lumière, Éditions Trois, 2005

Novels 
 Adéodat I, Éditions du Jour, 1973
 
 
 Fièvres blanches, Les Éditions XYZ, 1994
 Les Épervières, Les Éditions XYZ, 1996
 Adèle intime, Les Éditions XYZ, 1996
 Le Maître rêveur, Les Éditions XYZ, 1997

Essays and literary studies 
 Délit contre délit, Les Presses de l'A.G.E.U.M., 1965
 Hugo : amour, crime, révolution essai sur Les Misérables, Presses de l'Université de Montréal, 1974 ; réédition, Nota Bene, 1999
 L'Évasion tragique : essai sur les romans d'André Langevin, HMH Hurtubuse, 1985
 
 Le Singulier pluriel, L'Hexagone, 1992
 La Grande Langue : éloge de l'anglais, Les Éditions XYZ, 1993
 L'Institut Rossell (1934-1994), Les Éditions XYZ, 1994
 Roman et énumération de Flaubert à Perec, Département d'études françaises de l'Université de Montréal, 1996
 Une étude de Bonheur d'occasion, Boréal, 1998
 Saint-Denys Garneau, le poète, Les Éditions XYZ, 1999
 Anne Hébert : le secret de vie et de mort, Presses de l'Université d'Ottawa, 2000

Honors 
 1988 – Prix Gabrielle-Roy, La Visée critique
 1990 – 2e prix du Concours de nouvelles de Radio-Canada, L'Esprit ailleurs
 1990 – Prix du Gouverneur général, Dans les chances de l'air
 1991 – Prix du Gouverneur général, La Croix du Nord
 1993 – Prix littéraires du Journal de Montréal, La Vie aux trousses
 1995 – Grand Prix du Festival international de la poésie, Delà
 1996 – Membre de l'Académie des lettres du Québec
 2004 – Prix du Gouverneur général, Les Jours à vif

References

External links 
 Documentation critique sur l'œuvre d'André Brochu (Site auteurs.contemporain.info)
 Bibliographie complète de l'auteur

Governor General's Award-winning fiction writers
Academic staff of the Université de Montréal
Writers from Quebec
People from Saint-Eustache, Quebec
Université de Montréal alumni
Canadian poets in French
Canadian male poets
Canadian male novelists
Canadian novelists in French
20th-century Canadian novelists
20th-century Canadian poets
20th-century Canadian male writers
Governor General's Award-winning poets
1942 births
Living people
20th-century Canadian essayists
Canadian male essayists
Canadian non-fiction writers in French